Ewald Kihle (11 August 1919 – 16 April 1990) was a Norwegian footballer. He played in two matches for the Norway national football team in 1951.

References

External links
 

1919 births
1990 deaths
Norwegian footballers
Norway international footballers
Place of birth missing
Association footballers not categorized by position